The 1983 Miami Hurricanes football team represented the University of Miami during the 1983 NCAA Division I-A football season. In their 58th season of football, the independent Hurricanes were led by fifth-year head coach Howard Schnellenberger and played their home games at the Orange Bowl.

Unranked, Miami lost their opener at Florida by 25 points, but finished the regular season  ranked fifth, and were invited to the Orange Bowl. Playing at home on January 2, the underdog Hurricanes upset top-ranked Nebraska  denying a two-point conversion attempt with less than a minute  They climbed to first in the major polls to win the school's first

Schedule

Personnel

Rankings

Season summary

at Florida

at Houston

Purdue

Notre Dame

at Duke

Louisville

at Mississippi State

at Cincinnati

West Virginia

East Carolina

at Florida State

Jeff Davis game-winning 19-yard field goal as time expired

Orange Bowl (vs Nebraska)

Source: Box Score

Awards and honors

All-Americans
 Jay Brophy, LB
 Glenn Dennison, TE

Jack Harding University of Miami MVP Award
 Glenn Dennison, TE

References

Miami
Miami Hurricanes football seasons
College football national champions
Orange Bowl champion seasons
Miami Hurricanes football